The 258th Infantry Division was an infantry unit of the German Army in World War II.

Combat History
After formation, the division was moved to southern Poland, where it became the Army Group reserve of Army Group South.
At the end of the Polish campaign, the division remained as part of the occupation forces in Poland in December 1939 and
moved to the Saarbrücken area, where it remained on the defensive, even during the initial phase of Operation Red, the attack on France.

On 14 June 1940 the Division attacked the Maginot Line and after successfully broke through and advanced in the direction of Nancy.

Committed from the opening phases of operation Barbarossa, the 258th division participated in the early encirclement battles at Bialstock, and during the battle of Smolensk was committed to a defensive role, first of the Army Group Center's southern flank, south of Mogilev, and later, after Guderian's wheel to the south, protecting the left flank of his panzer group.

By October 1941, Army Group Center could finally launch operation Typhoon, the attack towards Moscow. The division was attached to XL Panzer Corps, part of Panzer Group 4 for the attack. In a matter of days the Soviet defenses spectacularly collapsed opening up a clear way towards the Soviet capital, but at the same time the autumn rains (the Rasputitsa) started and with them the supply situation deteriorated alarmingly. The troops were forced to live off the land, foraging for livestock, potatoes and coal. The supply services began to adopt the indigenous 'Panje' carts as the only reliable transport, but their low capacity meant the division received only one fourth of its ammunition requirements. Also losses in weapons were made up by using captured Russian equipment.
The division advanced through the mud finally reaching the town of Khimki, eight kilometres from Moscow.

Between February 1942 and July 1942 the division remained in defensive positions east of Wiasma.
The winter fighting of 1941/2 had denuded the division of its infantry combat strength, and it initially could only defend a narrow sector.
As replacements arrived its infantry battalions were rebuilt, and the defensive sector it controlled continued to widen until by February 1943 it had grown to over 40 kilometers.

Kursk
Following the encirclement of the 6th Army at Stalingrad, the attacks of the Soviet winter offensive continued to ripple along the face of the eastern front.
In February 1942 the defensive front of the 2nd Army gave way south of Orel along the 2nd Panzer Army boundary. The attacking Soviet armies could now swing to the north and threaten Orel from the south and the east. To halt this drive Army Group Center shifted forces to the area, and the 258th Infantry division was taken out of line and assigned to the new 2nd Panzer Army front forming south of Orel. Here the division stabilized the front in its sector, but the Soviet incursion had formed a large salient around the city of Kursk.

In July 1943 the division attacked the Kursk salient as part of the German summer offensive, that was hoped would wrest the initiative from the Soviet armies and return the wehrmacht to winning ways.
However the attack on Kursk proved a costly failure, and the 258th suffered heavy casualties attempting to break through the deep Soviet defenses.
The Soviets countered with an offensive of their own, eliminating the German bulge at Orel, and forcing them to retreat to a shorter line.

The division was then shifted to the south and subsequently retreated with Army Group South to the Dnieper line, where it fought in the Nikopol bridgehead.
After the collapse of Army groups positions along the Dnieper, the division retreated gradually through the Ukraine, finally ending up on the defensive in Romania, where the front temporarily stabilized.

Here on 20 August the Soviet 3rd Ukrainian Front, renewing the attack, crashed through the Romanian and German defenses, encircling the entire German 6th Army.
By the end of the month the German pockets were eliminated and the 258th Division was totally destroyed in these actions.
The division was not rebuilt.

Commanders

 Generalleutnant Walter Wollmann 26.August.1939 – 1.August.1940
 Generalleutnant Waldemar Henrici 1.August.1940 – 2.October.1941
 Generalmajor Karl Pflaum 2.October.1941 – 18.January.1942
 Generalleutnant Hans-Kurt Höcker 18.January.1942 – 1.October.1943
 Generalleutnant Eugen-Heinrich Bleyer 1.October.1943 – 4.September.1944
 Oberst Rudolf Hielscher 4.September.1944 – unknown

Organisation 
1939
 Infantry Regiment 458 (I, II, III)
 Infantry Regiment 478 (I, II, III)
 Infantry Regiment 479 (I, II, III)
 Reconnaissance Battalion 258
 Artillery Regiment 258 (I, II, III, IV)
 Engineer Battalion 258
 Anti-tank Battalion 258
 Signals Battalion 258
 Division services 258

1942
 Grenadier Regiment 458 (I, II, III)
 Grenadier Regiment 478 (I, II, III)
 Grenadier Regiment 479 (I, II, III)
 Bicycle Detachment 258
 Artillery Regiment 258 (I, II, III, IV)
 Engineer Battalion 258
 Anti-tank Battalion 258
 Signals Battalion 258
 Division services 258

1943-1944
 Grenadier Regiment 478 (I, II)
 Grenadier Regiment 479 (I, II)
 Divisions Group 387
  Group Staff
  Regiment Group 525
  Regiment Group 542
 Fusilier Battalion 258
 Artillery Regiment 258
  I. Abteilung
  II. Abteilung
  III./Artillery Regiment 387
  IV. Abteilung
 Engineer Battalion 258
 Anti-tank Battalion 258
 Signals Battalion 258
 Field replacement Battalion 258
 Division services 258

References

Infantry divisions of Germany during World War II
Military units and formations established in 1939
1939 establishments in Germany
Military units and formations disestablished in 1944